Pipat Thonkanya born 4 January 1979 as Anon Thonkanya , in Udon Thani), is a Thai former football player. He was a forward.

In 2009, he played for Persisam Samarinda in the Indonesian Super League. At the half way stage in the 2009 Thai Premier League season, he was joint second in the top goalscorers list with 7 goals. Pipat also had spells at AFC Champions League 2003 runners up BEC Tero Sasana F.C. and a spell in Vietnam. He was also instrumental in Buriram PEA F.C. winning the 2008 Thai Premier League.

He scored 14 goals for the national team, including 2 goals in the 2007 Asian Cup, and was recently recalled to the national team, thanks to his good performances for Thai Port F.C.

Honours

International
 2000 Tiger Cup with Winners
Clubs
 Thailand Premier League 2008
 T&T Cup: 2008

International career

Pipat was a member of the victorious T&T Cup 2008 winning squad. He scored two goals in the 2007 Asian Cup for the national team in a successful campaign where they were eliminated only on goal difference from a tough group containing Australia and eventual winners Iraq. Thonkanya's goals came in the form of a brace against Oman in a 2–0 win (scoring in the 70th and 78th minutes).

International goals

External links
 
 

1979 births
Living people
Pipat Thonkanya
Pipat Thonkanya
Association football forwards
Pipat Thonkanya
Binh Dinh FC players
Dong Thap FC players
Pipat Thonkanya
Pipat Thonkanya
Pipat Thonkanya
Persisam Putra Samarinda players
Pipat Thonkanya
Pipat Thonkanya
Pipat Thonkanya
Pipat Thonkanya
Pipat Thonkanya
Pipat Thonkanya
Pipat Thonkanya
Pipat Thonkanya
Thai expatriate footballers
V.League 2 players
Thai expatriate sportspeople in Vietnam
Expatriate footballers in Vietnam
Liga 1 (Indonesia) players
Thai expatriate sportspeople in Indonesia
Expatriate footballers in Indonesia
Pipat Thonkanya
2000 AFC Asian Cup players
2007 AFC Asian Cup players